Rowshan Kuh (also Romanized as Rowshan Kūh or Roshankouh) is a village in Garmab Rural District, Chahardangeh District, Sari County, Mazandaran Province, Iran. At the 2006 census, its population was 34, in 15 families.

Rowshan Kuh has a substantial Baha'i population. Since 2016, authorities have bulldozed and confiscated Baha'i land on several occasions, on spurious grounds that development is encroaching on protected lands. Amnesty International has characterized this campaign as part of a widespread persecution of Baha'is by the Iranian government, noting that at least 18 Baha'i farmers have lost their livelihoods as of August 2022.

References 

Populated places in Sari County
Persecution of Bahá'ís